Acinetobacter vivianii is a bacterium from the genus of Acinetobacter. It was named after British Biologist Professor Alan Vivian.

References

External links
Type strain of Acinetobacter vivianii at BacDive -  the Bacterial Diversity Metadatabase

Moraxellaceae
Bacteria described in 2016